Eugenio Da Venezia (November 9, 1900 – September 7, 1992) was an Italian painter. He was a member of the group known as I Giovani di Palazzo Carminati (the youths of Palazzo Carminati). This group rejected the prevailing style of the Italian Academy at the beginning of the 20th century. Da Venezia painted in a post-impressionist style, influenced by the Venetian tradition of the vedutisti. He exhibited in ten editions of Venice Biennale between 1934 and 1956, including the XL anniversary in 1935.

Biography
Eugenio Da Venezia was born in Venice. He trained at the Art Institute and the Academy of Fine Arts in Venice. His teachers were Ettore Tito, Emilio Paggiaro and Vittorio Bressanin. Later he studied at the Opera Bevilacqua La Masa in Palazzo Carminati in Venice, where his painting style developed. Here he was part of the group later known as I Giovani di Palazzo Carminati (The Palazzo Carminati Young) with Marco Novati, Fioravante Seibezzi, Juti Ravenna, Neno Mori, Mario Varagnolo and others. This group was influenced by Pio Semeghini and by the Scuola di Burano (Burano School). They were an anti-academic movement characterized by clear tones, and direct contact with nature. Eugenio Da Venezia and his painters friends rejected the avant-garde art for a real representation of the nature, portraits, still life using the colour as main element, according to the history of Art Venice tradition.

From 1925 to 1956, Eugenio Da Venezia started exhibiting at annual exhibitions of Ca' Pesaro (International Gallery of Modern Art in Venice). During the Venice Biennale in 1934 he met the art magnate, the Duc de Trèvise (Sauvegard de l'Art Francaise), and the old Pierre Bonnard. They were impressed by Da Venezia's great skill as a colourist. As a result of this general appreciation from 1935 to 1940 he lived and exhibited in Paris. Back in Italy he participated in numerous exhibitions, including different editions of Venice Biennale, the VI Quadriennale di Roma in Rome, the Michetti Prize, the Opera Bevilacqua La Masa and many others.

During the second half of the 20th century he continued painting and exhibiting throughout Italy, receiving numerous feedbacks of respect. Da Venezia's style remained post-impressionist until his death, rejecting avant-garde art movements such as Futurism, Cubism, Abstract art, Action painting.

From the beginning of the 21st century the Italian art critic and curator Alain Chivilò decided to create a web site as tribute to Master Eugenio Da Venezia. For the first time a painter of I Giovani di Palazzo Carminati (the youths of Palazzo Carminati) group has dedicated an official internet page: biography, exhibitions, critical texts, photos, paintings and many more.

Exhibitions 

Posthumous exhibitions

Other exhibitions at which Da Venezia's work was displayed

Further reading (in Italian)

"Da Venezia, Vita ed Opere del Maestro" di Gino Damerini
"E. Da Venezia, Vita ed Opere del Maestro" di Pietro Zampetti, Venezia 1968
"Eugenio Da Venezia, Vita ed Opere del Maestro" di Paolo Rizzi. Edizione Galleria d'Arte Moderna Ravagnan - Venezia, September 1971
"Mezzo Secolo di pittura nel Veneto", di Paolo Rizzi. All. Nr. 3 alla rivista Bolaffi Arte Nr. 72, Torino 09/1977
Autori Vari, "Mostra Antologica", Bevilacqua La Masa Comune di Venezia, Venezia, 1968
Autori Vari, "Eugenio Da Venezia. Retrospettiva Antologica 1926 - 1985", Comune di Abano Terme Assessorato alla Cultura, Conselve, 1985
Eugenio Da Venezia, "Pensieri personali di Eugenio Da Venezia sull'Arte scritti tra il 1986/87", Official web site, interview section, Venezia, 2006
"La Valigia ieri e oggi", di Bevilacqua La Masa Catalogo Mostra 02-22/10 -1982, presso Museo Cà Pesaro, Venezia
"Eugenio Da Venezia. La donazione alla Querini Stampalia", Milano, Electa, 1990 - Catalogo Mostra 09/11 - 09/12 -1990, presso Palazzo Querini, Venezia
Collana dei "Quaderni della Donazione Da Venezia", a cura di Giuseppina Dal Canton

External links
Further information: http://www.eugeniodavenezia.eu

1900 births
1992 deaths
20th-century Italian painters
Italian male painters
Post-impressionist painters
Painters from Venice
Accademia di Belle Arti di Venezia alumni
20th-century Italian male artists